The Roman Catholic Diocese of Brownsville is a Latin Church in the southern part of Texas in the United States.

The Diocese of Brownsville is a suffragan diocese in the ecclesiastical province of the Metropolitan Archdiocese of Galveston-Houston, in Texas. The diocese's first cathedral church is Immaculate Conception Cathedral in  Brownsville, Texas.

History

1690 to 1965 
The first Catholic mission in Texas, then part of the Spanish Empire, was San Francisco de los Tejas. It was founded by Franciscan Father Damián Massanet in 1690 in the Weches area. The priests left the mission after three years, then established a second mission, Nuestro Padre San Francisco de los Tejas. near present day Alto in 1716.

In 1839, after the 1836 founding of the Texas Republic, Pope Gregory XVI erected the prefecture apostolic of Texas, covering its present day area. In 1847, the vicariate became the Diocese of Galveston. In 1874, Pope Pius IX established the Vicariate Apostolic of Brownsville out of the Diocese of Galveston.  The new vicariate included all the settlements south of the Nueces River to the Rió Grande River. In 1912, Pope Pius X erected the Diocese of Corpus Christi, which included the Brownsville area.

1965 to 1980 
Pope Paul VI erected the Diocese of Brownsville in 1965, taking its territory from the Diocese of Corpus Christi. That same year, The pope appointed Reverend Adolph Marx of the Diocese of Corpus Christi as the first bishop of Brownsville. Marx died a few months later that year; Paul VI then named Reverend Humberto Medeiros of the Diocese of Fall River as his replacement.

Medeiros' appointment came at the time of a threatened farm workers' strike. Many of his parishioners  were Mexican-American migrant workers. Medeiros was an advocate on behalf of workers, supporting their demands for a minimum wage at $1.25 an hour. 

During his tenure, Medeiros sold the episcopal limousine, converted all but one room of the episcopal residence into a dormitory for visiting priests, and often traveled with migrant workers to celebrate mass in the fields during the harvest season. He spent Christmas and Easter visiting prisoners in Texas jails. In 1970, Paul VI named Medeiros as archbishop of the Archdiocese of Boston.  The pope named Auxiliary Bishop John Fitzpatrick from the Archdiocese of Miami to replace Medeiros in Brownsville.

1980 to present 
In 1982, Fitzpatrick opened Casa Oscar Romero in Brownsville, named after the murdered Salvadorian archbishop, Oscar Arnulfo Romero.  It served as a shelter for refugees coming across the Mexican border into the United States.  He eventually closed the shelter after repeated complaints from federal judges that he was violating US immigration law.  Fitzpatrick set up a different shelter and even opened his own garage to refugees. As bishop, he set up an extensive program to train lay people to assume roles within the diocese.  He also established diocese radio and TV stations.

Auxiliary Bishop Enrique San Pedro of the Diocese of Galveston-Houston was appointed in 1991 by Pope John Paul II as the coadjutor bishop of the Diocese of Brownsville. After Fitzpatrick retired later that year, San Pedro automatically became bishop of Brownsville. He died in 1994 after less than three years in office. In 1965, John Paul II appointed Bishop Raymundo Peña of the Diocese of El Paso as the next bishop of Brownsville. Peña retired in 2009.

The current bishop of the Diocese of Brownsville is Daniel E. Flores, formerly an auxiliary bishop of the Archdiocese of Detroit.  He was named by Pope Benedict XVI in 2009.

Sex abuse 
On December 6, 2004, the Dallas Morning News published a report on how Bishop Peña handled accusations of sexual abuse against a foreign priest. Basil Onyia, a Nigerian priest, arrived in Diocese of Brownsville in 1999 and was assigned as assistant pastor of the Basilica of Our Lady of San Juan del Valle.  In January 2009, Peña received complaints from two women in the parish that Onyia was touching them inappropriately.  He told Onyia to stop it.  

In April 2000, after a woman filed a police complaint, Peña transferred Onyia.  Later in 2000, two priests complained to Peña about Onyia's conduct.  In January 2001, Peña asks Onyia's bishop in Nigeria to recall him. In February 2001, the relatives of a developmentally disabled girl accused Onyia of rape.  Peña finally suspended Onyia, who fled to Nigeria to avoid arrest.

Statistics 
As of 2020, the Diocese of Brownsville served 1,171,182 Catholics (85.0% of 1,377,861 total) on 111,125 km² in 72 parishes, 44 missions, 108 priests (85 diocesan, 23 religious), 103 deacons, 72 lay religious (12 brothers, 60 nuns), and 12 seminarians.

The diocese has the second highest percentage of Catholics to total diocese population in the United States, second only to the Diocese of Laredo. As of 2020, the Diocese of Brownsville comprises 1,171,182 Catholics among a total population of 1,377,861, or 85.0%.

Bishops

Bishops of Brownsville
 Adolph Marx (1965)
 Humberto Sousa Medeiros (1966-1970), appointed Archbishop of Boston (Cardinal in 1973)
 John Joseph Fitzpatrick (1971-1991)
 Enrique San Pedro (1991-1994; Coadjutor 1991)
 Raymundo Joseph Peña (1994-2009)
 Daniel E. Flores (2010–present)

Current Auxiliary Bishop of Brownsville
 Mario Alberto Avilés (2018–present)

Other diocesan priest who became bishop
 Joseph Patrick Delaney, appointed Bishop of Fort Worth in 1981

Education

Universities 
 Catholic Campus Ministry, University of Texas Rio Grande Valley

High schools 
Saint Joseph Academy, Brownsville
Juan Diego Academy, Mission.

Middle and elementary schools 
 Guadalupe Regional Middle School, grades 6 through 8 (Brownsville)
 St. Joseph's School, grades prekindergarten (PK) to 8 (Edinburg)
 St. Mary's School, PK-6 (Brownsville)
 St. Luke's School, PK-8 (Brownsville, closed 2020)
 Our Lady of Sorrows School, PK-8 (McAllen)
 St. Anthony's School, PK-8 (Harlingen)
 Incarnate Word School, PK-8 (Brownsville)
 St. Martin de Porras School, PK-3 (Weslaco)
 Oratory Academy, PK-8 (Pharr)
 Our Lady of Guadalupe School, PK-6 (Mission)
 Immaculate Conception School, PK-8 (Rio Grande City)

Public broadcasting 
The diocese's radio and television stations are operated under the license name of RGV Educational Broadcasting, Inc.

 KJJF 88.9 FM and KHID 88.1 FM - NPR-member stations

See also 
 List of Catholic dioceses in the United States

References

External links 

 GCatholic, with Google map - data for most sections
 Roman Catholic Diocese of Brownsville Official Site 

 
Roman Catholic Ecclesiastical Province of Galveston–Houston
Roman Catholic dioceses in the United States
Roman Catholic dioceses and prelatures established in the 20th century
Culture of Brownsville, Texas
Religious organizations established in 1965
1965 establishments in Texas